Siri Alexander Andrahennady (born 18 July 1946) was a Sri Lankan politician who was Deputy Chairman of Committees (2001–2004).

Siri Andrahennady is Attorney-at-Law and Notary Public and received his early education at Ananda College, Colombo.

Andrahennady was elected Chairman of the Tangalle Town Council from 1989–1993. He was the elected onto the Southern Provincial Council 1994–1999, where he served as Minister of Agriculture, Fisheries and Local Government.

At the 11th parliamentary elections in October 2000 Andrahennady was elected as the United National Party member representing the Hambantota electorate. He was re-elected at the subsequent parliamentary elections in December 2001. Following which he was elected unopposed to the position of Deputy Chairman of Committees. At the April 2004 parliamentary elections he failed to get re-elected and lost his seat.

References

1946 births
Living people
Members of the Southern Provincial Council
United National Party politicians
Members of the 11th Parliament of Sri Lanka
Members of the 12th Parliament of Sri Lanka
Deputy chairmen of committees of the Parliament of Sri Lanka
20th-century Sri Lankan lawyers
Sri Lankan notaries